Çakırlı is a village in Tarsus  district of Mersin Province, Turkey. It is situated in the southern slopes of the Taurus Mountains. The population of Çakırlı  is 877 as of 2011. Grapes are the most important agricultural product of the village

References

Villages in Tarsus District